Pease, in Middle English, was a noun referring to the vegetable pea; see that article for its etymology. The word survives into modern English in pease pudding.

Pease may also refer to:

People
Pease family (Darlington), a prominent family in Darlington, UK
Al Pease (1921–2014), Formula One driver
Sir Alfred Pease, 2nd Baronet (1857–1939), English Liberal Party politician
Alfred Pease (musician) (1838–1882), composer
Arthur Pease (MP) (1837–1898), English MP
Sir Arthur Pease, 1st Baronet (1866–1927), 1st Baronet and British coal magnate and railway director
Arthur Stanley Pease (1881–1964), U.S. professor of Classics and amateur botanist
Bas Pease (1922–2004), British physicist
Bob Pease (1940–2011), analog integrated circuit design expert
Don Pease (1932–2002), U.S. Representative from Ohio
Edward Pease (disambiguation), several people
Elisha M. Pease (1812–1883), Texas governor
Francis G. Pease (1881–1938), astronomer
Frank Pease (1879–1959), Hollywood anti-Communist
Harl Pease (1917–1942), awarded the Medal of Honor
Henry Pease (disambiguation)
Herbert Pease, 1st Baron Daryngton (1867–1949), English MP
Howard Pease (1894–1974), American writer of children's literature
Jack Pease, 1st Baron Gainford (1860–1943), son of Sir Joseph Pease, 1st Baronet
Joachim Pease (1842-unknown), Medal of Honor recipient
John Pease (disambiguation), several people
Joseph Pease (railway pioneer) (1799–1872), first Quaker elected Member of Parliament, railway owner
Sir Joseph Pease, 1st Baronet, MP (1828–1903), son of Joseph Pease (1799–1872)
Joseph Pease, 2nd Baron Gainford (1889–1971)
Joseph Pease, 3rd Baron Gainford (1921–2013)
Ken Pease (born 1943), British criminologist
Lute Pease (1869–1963), American cartoonist
Patsy Pease (born 1956), American actress
Spencer A. Pease (1817–1889), American lawyer, physician, newspaper editor, and politician
William Harper Pease (1824–1871), American malacologist

Places

United Kingdom
Pease Pottage, West Sussex, UK
Pease Dean, Scottish Borders, Scotland
Pease Bay, a nature reserve at Pease Bay8

United States
Pease, Minnesota
Pease, Missouri
Pease Air Force Base, New Hampshire (now closed), named after Harl Pease
Pease Air National Guard Base, located on a portion of the former Air Force base
Portsmouth International Airport at Pease, often referred to as "Pease International Airport", at the former Air Force base, also named after Harl Pease

Other uses

See also

 Pea (disambiguation)
 Peace (disambiguation) 
 Piece (disambiguation)